Stipa lessingiana, called Lessing feather grass, is a species of flowering plant in the genus Stipa, found in steppes from Greece east to Mongolia, including the countries bordering the Black and Caspian Seas, Central Asia, western Siberia, the Altai, and Xinjiang in China. It has gained the Royal Horticultural Society's Award of Garden Merit.

References

lessingiana
Ornamental plants
Flora of Greece
Flora of Bulgaria
Flora of Romania
Flora of Ukraine
Flora of the Crimean Peninsula
Flora of Russia
Flora of West Siberia
Flora of Altai (region)
Flora of Turkey
Flora of the Caucasus
Flora of Iran
Flora of Central Asia
Flora of Xinjiang
Flora of Mongolia
Plants described in 1842